The Anne S. K. Brown Military Collection is one of the largest research collections devoted to the history and iconography of soldiers and soldiering, from circa 1500 to 1945. Formerly a private collection, it was donated to the Brown University Library in 1981.

Mrs. John Nicholas Brown (Anne Seddon Kinsolving Brown, 1906–1985) began collecting toy soldiers in 1930, but within a few years had moved on to acquiring graphics and monographs depicting or describing military uniforms. In the years following the Second World War, the collection increased dramatically, so much so that the Brown family were advised to move the archive out of their house for fear of causing structural damage from the weight. Today, the collection is located on the top floor of the John Hay Library situated on the Brown University campus.

Besides approximately 5,000 toy soldiers (additional figures can be found in the Annmary Brown Memorial on the Brown campus), the main focus of the collection are over 15,000 prints, drawings, paintings and watercolors. There are also photographs and sheet music covers. The graphics depict soldiers in battle, on parade, genre scenes, caricatures, military portraits, and uniform studies. Every major country is represented, with France, the United Kingdom, Germany and the German states being the largest sections. Other important parts focus on Austria, Russia, the United States and elsewhere. Complementing the graphic collection are over 20,000 books, and thousands of albums, sketchbooks, scrapbooks and portfolios. The monographs include army lists, regimental histories, biographies, campaign histories, humor, royalty and ceremonies, costume and early travel, uniform books, drill, tactics and regulation. There are many contemporary military regulations as well as a small collection of manuscript material.

External links

Anne S. K. Brown Military Collection, Brown University Library.
Brown University Library
Prints, Drawings and Watercolors from the Anne S.K. Brown Military Collection.

References
Hack, Susan, 'A love affair with uniforms, MHQ: The Quarterly Journal of Military History, Vol. 1, No. 2, Winter 1989, pp. 98–109.
Harrington, Peter, 'Anne Seddon Kinsolving Brown 1906–1985', Books at Brown, Vol. XL, 1998, pp. 1–13.
Special Collections at Brown University. A History and Guide

Archives in the United States
Brown University
Military art
War art
Military historiography